The Securities Association of China  (SAC) is a self-regulatory organization for securities industry established according to the provisions of the "Securities Law of the People's Republic of China" and the "Administrative Regulations on the Registration of Public Organizations". SAC is a non-profit social institutional legal person function under the guidance and supervision of the China Securities Regulatory Commission (CSRC) and the Ministry of Civil Affairs of China.

History
Since established on August 28, 1991, SAC has earnestly enforced its Articles of Association and acted according to the principles of "Legitimate, Supervision, Self-regulation and Normalization".

Under the supervision and direction of CSRC, SAC relies on its members to discharge its 3 major functions: "Self-regulation, Bridging and Service".

Board of directors
The Board of Directors is the executive body. SAC operates under the Chairman Responsibility System. On 22 January 2007, Mr. Huang Xiangping was elected as the Chairman in the fourth Member General Meeting.

By May 1, 2007, SAC has 299 members in total, including:
109 Securities Companies
51 fund management companies
92 securities investment consulting institutions 
3 assets managements companies 
44 special members (2 stock exchanges, 1 securities depository and clear company, 8 fund custodian institutions and 33 local securities associations)

Objectives
 Conducting self-regulation over securities industry under the government's centralized and comprehensive supervision and management;
 Bridging between the Government and the industry;
 Providing services to members, protecting the lawful rights and interests of members;
 Maintaining fair competition order in securities industry, promoting transparency, justice and fairness of the securities market and push forward healthy and steady development of the securities market.

References

External links
 Official website
 Official website 

Professional associations based in China
Finance in China
Finance industry associations